Amy Barr Mlinar is an American planetary geophysicist known for her studies of icy body formation. She is a member of the National Academies Standing Committee on Astrobiology and Planetary Science and a co-investigator on NASA's Europa Imaging System and REASON instruments.

Early life and education 
Born Amy Barr in Palo Alto, California, she attended Caltech for her undergraduate degree, earning a bachelor's degree in planetary science in 2000. She completed her graduate studies at the University of Colorado Boulder, earning a master's degree in 2002 and her doctorate in 2004.

Career and research 
She began her research career as a postdoctoral researcher at Washington University in St. Louis in 2005, then moved to the Southwest Research Institute in 2006, where she remained until 2011. She then accepted an appointment at Brown University and subsequently moved to the Planetary Science Institute in 2015, where she is a senior scientist as of 2016. Her research focuses on the formation of Callisto, seismic activity on Enceladus, and the Late Heavy Bombardment.

Publications

References

External links 
 Women in Planetary Science interview with Barr Mlinar

1970s births
Living people
American women scientists
Women geophysicists
Women planetary scientists
Planetary scientists
California Institute of Technology alumni
University of Colorado Boulder alumni
Year of birth uncertain
People from Palo Alto, California
21st-century American women
Washington University in St. Louis fellows
Brown University faculty